Alec Dufty (born March 11, 1987) is a former American soccer player and current coach. He is currently a goalkeeper coach with Sporting Kansas City in Major League Soccer.

Career

College and Amateur
Dufty grew up in Raleigh, North Carolina, and played college soccer at Appalachian State University and the University of Evansville, where he was an All-Missouri Valley Conference selection in his final two years.

During his college years Dufty also played with Raleigh Elite in the USL Premier Development League.

Professional
Dufty was signed by New York Red Bulls on 12 March 2009, and made his MLS debut on 11 April 2009, as a substitute for Danny Cepero in the eighth minute of a Major League Soccer match against Houston Dynamo at Robertson Stadium. Dufty did not concede a goal as New York held Houston to a scoreless draw. However, despite a strong display, he was waived by the club only three days later.

After being released, Dufty signed a contract to become part of the Major League Soccer League-Wide Reserve Goalkeeper Pool. During the May 2009 he was called up by Columbus Crew to provide cover for Andy Gruenebaum while Will Hesmer was out injured. On 27 February 2010 signed for new founded USSF D2 Pro League club AC St. Louis.

On March 1, 2011, Dufty signed a contract with Chicago Fire of Major League Soccer. At season's end his 2012 contract option was declined by Chicago and he entered the 2011 MLS Re-Entry Draft. Dufty was not selected in the draft and became a free agent.

Dufty's father David Dufty was a third round draft pick (48th overall) of the San Jose Earthquakes in the 1975 NASL draft. The 6'6" Dufty played four years at Colgate University and would have been the tallest player in the NASL, but did not get signed by the Earthquakes.

International
Dufty was called up to the United States U-20 men's national soccer team for a friendly versus Argentina in May 2007. Dufty did not play though, as Argentina won 1-0 with a goal from Braghieri in front of 3,531 people at PAETEC Park in Rochester, New York.

Statistics

References

External links

1987 births
Living people
American soccer players
North Carolina FC U23 players
New York Red Bulls players
AC St. Louis players
Chicago Fire FC players
Appalachian State Mountaineers men's soccer players
Evansville Purple Aces men's soccer players
Association football goalkeepers
USL League Two players
Major League Soccer players
USSF Division 2 Professional League players